Operation RYAN (or RYaN, and sometimes written as VRYAN) was a Cold War military intelligence program run by the Soviet Union during the early 1980s when they believed the United States was planning for an imminent first strike attack. The name is an acronym for Raketno-Yadernoe Napadenie ("Nuclear Missile Attack"). The purpose of the operation was to collect intelligence on potential contingency plans of the Reagan administration to launch a nuclear first strike against the Soviet Union. The program was initiated in May 1981 by Yuri Andropov, then chairman of the KGB.

Background
Andropov suffered from a "Hungarian complex" from his personal experience of the Hungarian Revolution in 1956 according to the historian Christopher Andrew. Andropov had, as the Soviet ambassador to Hungary, "watched in horror from the windows of his embassy as officers of the hated Hungarian security service were strung up from lampposts". Andropov remained haunted for the rest of his life by the speed with which an apparently all-powerful Communist one-party state had begun to topple. Leonid Brezhnev and Yuri Andropov, then Chairman of the KGB, justified the creation of Operation RYaN because, they claimed, the United States was "actively preparing for nuclear war" against the Soviet Union and its allies. According to a newly released Stasi report, the primary "Chekist work" discussed in the May 1981 meeting was the "demand to allow for 'no surprise.'"

Operation
The Soviet defector Oleg Gordievsky divulged a top-secret KGB telegram sent to the London KGB residency in February 1983. It stated: "The objective of the assignment is to see that the Residency works systematically to uncover any plans in preparation by the main adversary [USA] for RYAN and to organize a continual watch to be kept for indications of a decision being taken to use nuclear weapons against the USSR or immediate preparations being made for a nuclear missile attack." An attachment listed seven "immediate" and thirteen "prospective" tasks for the agents to complete and report. These included: the collection of data on potential places of evacuation and shelter, an appraisal of the level of blood held in blood banks, observation of places where nuclear decisions were made and where nuclear weapons were stored, observation of key nuclear decision makers, observation of lines of communication, reconnaissance of the heads of churches and banks, and surveillance of security services and military installations.

RYAN took on a new significance after the announcement of plans to deploy Pershing II nuclear-armed missiles to West Germany. These missiles were designed to be launched from road-mobile vehicles, making the launch sites very hard to find. The flight time from West Germany to European Russia was only four to six minutes (approximate flying time from six to eight minutes from West Germany to Moscow), giving the Soviets little or no warning.

On 23 March 1983 Ronald Reagan publicly announced development of the Strategic Defense Initiative. The Soviet government felt that the purpose of SDI technology was to render the US invulnerable to Soviet attack, thereby allowing the US to launch missiles against the USSR without fear of retaliation. This concern about a surprise attack prompted the sudden expansion of the RYAN program. The level of concern reached its peak after the Soviets shot down KAL 007 near Moneron Island on 1 September 1983, and during the North Atlantic Treaty Organization exercise Able Archer 83. The Soviet Union believed that a United States first strike on the Soviet Union was imminent.

Although Andropov died in February 1984, RYAN continued to be maintained and developed under the direction of Victor Chebrikov. Consultations held in August 1984 between the STASI's head of the Main Directorate of Reconnaissance, Markus Wolf and KGB experts discussed the early detection of potential war preparations in adversaries and indicated that the First Chief Directorate of the KGB was proposing to create a new division to deal exclusively with RYAN. 300 positions within the KGB were earmarked for RYAN of which 50 were reserved for the new division.

Operation RYAN continued to be maintained until at least April 1989.

See also

Able Archer 83
Deutschland 83
Warsaw Pact Early Warning Indicator Project

Further reading
 The Brink, Marc Ambinder, Simon & Schuster, 2018.
 1983: Reagan, Andropov, and a World on the Brink, Taylor Downing, Da Capo, 2018.
The Vicious Circle of Intelligence - Nate Jones, The National Security Archive
The Able Archer 83 Sourcebook - Nate Jones, The National Security Archive 
Forecasting Nuclear War: Stasi/KGB Intelligence Cooperation Under Project RYAN - Bernd Schaefer, Nate Jones, and Benjamin B. Fischer - The Wilson Center
Stasi Documents Provide Details on Operation RYaN, the Soviet Plan to Predict and Preempt a Western Nuclear Strike; Show Uneasiness Over Degree of "Clear-Headedness About the Entire RYaN Complex.  - Nate Jones, The National Security Archive
War Scare – Peter Vincent Pry
A Cold War Conundrum: The 1983 Soviet War Scare – Benjamin B. Fischer

References

Cold War intelligence operations
Cold War military history of the Soviet Union
Nuclear strategy
Nuclear warfare
Soviet Union intelligence operations
Military history of the Soviet Union
Foreign relations of the Soviet Union
Soviet Union–United States relations
1981 establishments in the Soviet Union
1981 in international relations
1981 in military history
KGB operations
War scare